The ARCO Center for Visual Art was a not-for-profit gallery, funded by the Atlantic Richfield Company in Los Angeles California. It opened in 1976 and closed in 1984. The gallery focused on contemporary art. It was located at the Atlantic Richfield Plaza, 505 South Flower Street.

Selected exhibitors were Carlos Almaraz, Herbert Bayer, Peter Alexander, Larry Bell, Donald Cole, William Crutchfield, Walter Gabrielson, Joe Goode, George Herms, Craig Kauffman, Liga Pang, Don Potts, Joseph Raffael, Stuart Rapeport, Frank Romero, Edward Ruscha, Hassel Smith, Michael Todd.

References
(Aug 1, 1984), "On the Passing of ARCO's Center for Visual Art", Los Angeles Times

Art galleries established in 1976
Art galleries disestablished in 1984
Museums established in 1976
Museums disestablished in 1984
Museums in Los Angeles
Art museums and galleries in California
Defunct art museums and galleries in California
Defunct museums in California
1976 establishments in California
1984 disestablishments in California